Velvetina is an album released in 2005 by the Spanish-Italian singer Miguel Bosé. Bosé has not yet made it clear whether the name was inspired by the Australian-manufactured decorative finish that describes itself as  "a strong, fine-grained decorative plaster finish with a distinctive velvety appearance."
The album was released in Spain as an audio CD, and as a special edition for the Creative Zen which featured audio, a video clip for each of the 13 songs and photography.

The album is an example of Miguel Bosé's innovative style; with Velvetina he blended Latin pop music with trip hop and electronic dance. Speaking of producing this album he said "Fue un trabajo muy interesante y estimulante, vamos, un reto." (It was interesting and stimulating work, yes, a challenge).
Personnel include Miguel Bosé as the main vocalist and instrumentalist, with Helen De Quiroga doing backup vocals and Antonio Cortés playing various instruments on the album.

Track list 

 Ojalá Ojalá (Hopefully, Hopefully) (4:43)
 Aun Más (Even More) (4:53)
 No Se Trata De  (It is Not About) (4:46)
 Hey Max (Hey Max) (4:38) 
 Celeste Amor (Celestial Love) (4:21)
 Ella Dijo No (She Said No)  (4:42)
 De La Mano De Dios (From the Hand of God) (4:02) 
 La Tropa Del Rey (The King's Troop) (4:51) 
 Verde Canalla (Green Scoundrel/Swine) (4:48) 
 Paro El Horizonte (I Stop the Horizon) (3:39)
 Down With Love (Down with Love) (4:33) 
 Tu Mano Dirá	(Your Hand will Tell) (4:42)
 May Day	(May Day)  (4:35)
 Remix (Ella Dijo No) (She Said No) (7:49)

Singles 

Two singles were released from Velvetina. 
 The first was "Down With Love", the video clip was vetoed in some countries as it contained references to the famous porn artist Nacho Vidal.
 The second single was "Hey Max", the music video of which was directed by the acclaimed Spanish artist Jaume de La Iguana.

References

External links
 Watch the Hey Max music video here.

2005 albums
Miguel Bosé albums
Warner Records albums